Gyai'ra Losang Dainzin (born c.1953) is a Tibetan politician and governor.

In 2003, he became vice-chairman of the Tibet Autonomous Region government. He is the son of the noted politician Lhalu Tsewang Dorje.

He is also the grandson of Lungshar, who was an influential official in the Lhasa government and a favourite of the 13th Dalai Lama until his death in 1933.

References

External links
English.people.com.cn: Democracy Extending to Every Corner on Tibetan Plateau

Living people
1950s births
Tibetan politicians